

The Thaden T-4 Argonaut was a 1930s American four-seat all-metal cabin monoplane built by the Thaden Metal Aircraft Company of San Francisco, California.

Design and development
The T-4 was the third and last design of the Thaden Metal Aircraft Company which had been formed by Herbert von Thaden, a former United States Army Signal Corps pilot and engineer, to work on developing the first American all-metal aircraft. The T-4 was a high-wing monoplane powered by a  Wright Whirlwind radial engine. It had a fixed conventional landing gear with a tailwheel. Two aircraft were built.

Specifications

See also

Thaden T-1
Thaden T-2

References

Notes

1930s United States civil utility aircraft
High-wing aircraft
Single-engined tractor aircraft
Aircraft first flown in 1930